Mount Khabarjina is a mountain and dormant volcano in the Caucasus of Georgia. It has an elevation of 3,142 metres. It is located near Mount Kazbek and is a part of its volcanic group. It is better known under the name Mount Kabardzhin.

See also 
Sakhizari Cliff Natural Monument

References

Mountains of Georgia (country)
Volcanoes of Georgia (country)
Dormant volcanoes